Lime Creek Township is one of sixteen townships in Cerro Gordo County, Iowa, USA.  As of the 2000 census, its population was 629.

Geography
Mason City, the county seat, borders it to the south.

References

External links
 US-Counties.com
 City-Data.com

Townships in Cerro Gordo County, Iowa
Mason City, Iowa micropolitan area
Townships in Iowa